Food Act may refer to:
 Food Act 1981, New Zealand
 Food Act 2006, Sweden
 Food Act 2014, New Zealand